Antoine Louis Dugès (19 December 1797 – 1 May 1838) was a French obstetrician and naturalist born in Charleville-Mézières, Ardennes. He was the father of zoologist Alfredo Dugès (1826–1910), and a nephew to midwife Marie-Louise Lachapelle (1769–1821).

He studied medicine in Paris and began work as a prosector in 1820. In 1825 he received his agrégation, shortly afterwards being appointed professor of obstetrics at the University of Montpellier. In 1826, he published Manuel d'obstétrique, a textbook on obstetrics that was published in several editions. He was also responsible for the publication of his aunt's works on obstetrics.

As a zoologist, Dugès conducted osteological and myological studies of amphibians. He also performed extensive research of acarids (mites). In 1838, he published an influential work on comparative physiology, titled Traité de physiologie comparée.

He was a member of several learned societies, including the Académie de Médecine and the Académie des sciences de Paris. He died in Montpellier on 1 May 1838, at the age of 40.

Eponyms
Antoine Louis Dugès is commemorated in the scientific name of a species of lizard, Lacerta dugesii.

The genus of freshwater planarians Dugesia is named after him.

Selected publications
Essai sur la nature de la fièvre, 1823
Manuel d'obstétrique, 1826
Discours sur les causes et le traitement des difformités du rachis, 1827
Recherches sur l'organisation et les mœurs des Planariées, 1828
Mémoire sur la conformité organique dans l'échelle animale, 1832
Recherches sur l'ostéologie et la myologie des batraciens à leurs différens âges, 1834
Recherches sur l'ordre des Acariens en général et la famille des Trombidées en particulier, 1834
Traité de physiologie comparée, 1838

Source
This article is based on a translation of an equivalent article at the French Wikipedia, reference listed as: Dictionnaire encyclopédique des sciences médicales: vol. 64, 1884, p. 642

References

1797 births
1838 deaths
People from Charleville-Mézières
French naturalists
Members of the French Academy of Sciences
French obstetricians
University of Montpellier people